Post Carbon Institute (PCI) is a think tank which provides information and analysis on climate change, energy scarcity, and other issues related to sustainability and long term community resilience. Its Fellows specialize in various fields related to the organization's mission, such as fossil fuels, renewable energy, food, water, and population. Post Carbon is incorporated as a 501(c)3 non-profit organization and is based in Corvallis, Oregon, United States.

Post Carbon Institute largely publishes and promotes the work of its Fellows and allies. It maintains two major websites, postcarbon.org for material from its staff and Fellows, and resilience.org for material from allies. Since 2009 it has focused on: publishing articles, reports, and books; running issue-oriented promotional campaigns; and serving as a speakers' bureau for some of its Fellows.

History

2003–2008 
Post Carbon Institute was founded by Julian Darley (President) and Celine Rich (Executive Director) in 2003. (Although not explicitly recognized as a founder, Dave Room helped build the Institute from months of its inception into a funded organization.) Its initial purpose was to implement programs to educate the public on issues surrounding global fossil fuel depletion (see peak oil, peak coal, peak gas) and climate change, as well as on possible responses to these challenges. A key tool for this was a film called "The End of Suburbia," which featured Richard Heinberg and James Howard Kunstler among others. Post Carbon promoted the concept of Relocalization, a strategy to build community resilience based on the local production of food, energy, and goods, and the development of more localized governance, economy, and culture.

Post Carbon Institute was one of the few organizations in this period actively promoting the concept of peak oil, along with groups such as the Association for the Study of Peak Oil and Gas, the International Forum on Globalization, and the Transition Towns movement, and websites such as EnergyBulletin.net and The Oil Drum. It ran the predominant online social network focused on community responses to peak oil and climate change, the Relocalization Network. Richard Heinberg joined as a Senior Fellow-in-Residence in 2008. Major activities included:

Global Public Media, streaming long format audio and video interviews about the issues surrounding fossil fuel depletion.
The Relocalization Network, a network of groups and individuals working to educate their local communities and develop programs to re-localize food and energy production, and reduce local consumption.
The Energy Farms Network, a demonstration and partnership program to explore production of feedstocks, fuels and electricity by local farmers for local users.
The Oil Depletion Protocol (aka the Rimini or Uppsala Protocol), a blueprint for an international agreement to avoid price and supply volatility problems associated with global oil production.

Since 2009 
Asher Miller became Executive Director in 2009, and Post Carbon restructured to concentrate its program activities on research and publishing. It broadened its topical focus to include natural resource depletion, climate change, the limits to economic growth, human overpopulation, food, and other issues - partly in response to the changed U.S. political landscape following the 2008 oil crisis, the financial crisis of 2007–2008, and the election of President Barack Obama (see Post Carbon Institute Manifesto). Most of its earlier programs were consolidated or discontinued. It entered into partnerships with Transition US and Energy Bulletin.net, a clearinghouse website on issues surrounding global energy resource depletion. Its roster of Fellows was significantly expanded to include notable figures such as Bill McKibben, Wes Jackson, David Orr, and Majora Carter.

Activities

Resilience.org 
Resilience.org is a resource platform for communities building local self-reliance, emphasizing community-based responses to the rapidly emerging fallout from the end of cheap fossil fuels. It was launched in 2012 as the successor to the popular peak oil website EnergyBulletin.net.

Think Resilience 
Think Resilience is an online course on "how to make sense of the complex challenges society now faces" and "how to build community resilience."

Publications 
Since 2012, publications have focused primarily on energy and/or community resilience:

Energy 
 Report: Shale Reality Check 2019, by J. David Hughes (2019)
 Report: How Long Will the Shale Revolution Last?: Technology versus Geology and the Lifecycle of Shale Plays, by J. David Hughes (2019)
 Book: Oil, Power, and War: A Dark History, by Matthieu Auzanneau, foreword by Richard Heinberg, published by Chelsea Green (2018); English translation of Or noir: la grande histoire du pétrole, published by Éditions La Découverte (2015)
 Report: Shale Reality Check, by J. David Hughes (2018)
 Report: 2016 Tight Oil Reality Check, by J. David Hughes (2016)
 Report: 2016 Shale Gas Reality Check, by J. David Hughes (2016)
 Book: Our Renewable Future: Laying the Path for One Hundred Percent Clean Energy, by Richard Heinberg and David Fridley, published by Island Press (2016)
 Report: Renewable Energy After COP21, by Richard Heinberg (2015)
 Report: Tight Oil Reality Check, by J. David Hughes (2015)
 Report: Shale Gas Reality Check, by J. David Hughes (2015)
 Book: Afterburn: Society Beyond Fossil Fuels, by Richard Heinberg, published by New Society (2015)
 Report: Drilling Deeper: A Reality Check on U.S. Government Forecasts for a Lasting Tight Oil & Shale Gas Boom, by J. David Hughes (2014)
 Report: Drilling California: A Reality Check on the Monterey Shale, by J. David Hughes, with Physicians Scientists and Engineers for Healthy Energy (2013)
 Book: Snake Oil: How Fracking's False Promise of Plenty Imperils Our Future, by Richard Heinberg (2013)
 Report: Drill Baby Drill: Can Unconventional Fuels Usher in a New Era of Energy Abundance, by J. David Hughes (2013)
 Campaign: The Energy Reality Campaign, with various allies
 Book: ENERGY: Overdevelopment and the Delusion of Endless Growth, edited by Tom Butler and George Wuerthner, published by Watershed Media with the Foundation for Deep Ecology (2013). With essays by Lester Brown, Amory Lovins, Bill McKibben and others.
 Book: The ENERGY Reader, edited by Tom Butler, Daniel Lerch, and George Wuerthner, published by Watershed Media with the Foundation for Deep Ecology (2013). With essays by Winona LaDuke, Vandana Shiva, and others.
 Report: Will Natural Gas Fuel America in the 21st Century?, by J. David Hughes (2011)
 Video: 300 years of fossil fuels in 300 seconds, Winner of a YouTube DoGooder best non-profit video award (2011)
 Report: Searching for a Miracle: 'Net Energy' Limits & the Fate of Industrial Society, by Richard Heinberg, with the International Forum on Globalization (2010)
 Report: Preparing for Peak Oil: Local Authorities and the Energy Crisis by The Oil Depletion Analysis Centre (ODAC) and Post Carbon Institute (2008)
 Book: Post Carbon Cities: Planning for Energy and Climate Uncertainty by Daniel Lerch (2007)

Community Resilience 

 Book: The Community Resilience Reader: Essential Resources for an Era of Upheaval, edited by Daniel Lerch with authors including Richard Heinberg, Chuck Collins & Sarah Byrnes, William Rees, Stephanie Mills, Brian Walker & David Salt, Rebecca Wodder, Denise Fairchild & Al Weinrub, and Mike Lydon; published by Island Press (2017)
Report: Six Foundations for Building Community Resilience, by Daniel Lerch (2015)
Book: Vermont Dollars, Vermont Sense, by Michael Shuman and Gwendolyn Hallsmith (2015)
 Report: Resilient Against What?: How Leading U.S. Municipalities Are Understanding and Acting on Resilience, by Jim Thayer, Morgan Rider, and Daniel Lerch (2013)
 Book: Rebuilding the Foodshed: How to Create Local, Sustainable, and Secure Food Systems, by Philip Ackerman-Leist, published by Chelsea Green Publishing (2013)
Book: Power from the People: How to Organize, Finance, and Launch Local Energy Projects, by Greg Pahl, published by Chelsea Green Publishing (2012)
Book: Local Dollars, Local Sense: How to Shift Your Money from Wall Street to Main Street and Achieve Real Prosperity, by Michael Shuman, published by Chelsea Green Publishing (2012)
 Book: The Post Carbon Reader: Managing the 21st Century’s Sustainability Crises, edited by Richard Heinberg & Daniel Lerch with authors including Peter C. Whybrow, David W. Orr, and Sandra Postel, published by Watershed Media (2010), winner of the Independent Publisher Book Award Gold Medal (Environment/Ecology/Nature)

Other Topics 

 Report: The Future is Rural: Food System Adaptations to the Great Simplification by Jason Bradford (2019)
Report: There's No App for That: Technology and Morality in the Age of Climate Change, Overpopulation, and Biodiversity Loss, by Richard Heinberg (2017)
Report: Climate After Growth: Why Environmentalists Must Embrace Post-Growth Economics and Community Resilience, by Asher Miller and Rob Hopkins (2013)
Book: The End of Growth: Adapting to Our New Economic Reality by Richard Heinberg, published by New Society Publishers (2011)
Report: The Real New Deal: Energy Scarcity and the Path to Energy, Economic, and Environmental Recovery by Richard Heinberg, Daniel Lerch, Asher Miller (2009)
Report: The Food and Farming Transition by Richard Heinberg and Michael Bomford (2009)

Fellows 

Richard Heinberg
Anthony Perl
Bill McKibben
Bill Sheehan
Brian Schwartz
Cindy Parker
David Fridley
David Hughes
David Orr
Erika Allen
Gloria Flora
Hillary Brown
Janelle Orsi
John Kaufmann
Joshua Farley
Majora Carter
Michael Bomford
Michael Shuman
Paul Gilding
Rob Hopkins
Peter Whybrow
Sandra Postel
Stephanie Mills
Tom Whipple
Warren Karlenzig
Wes Jackson
William E. Rees (academic)
William Ryerson
Zenobia Barlow

See also 
Community Resilience
Peak oil
 Resource depletion
 Transition Towns
Climate change mitigation

References

Non-profit organizations based in California
Think tanks based in the United States
501(c)(3) organizations
Environmental organizations established in 2003
Organizations established in 2003